The Gorgeous were a Canadian metalcore band formed in the summer of 2003 in Vancouver/Kelowna, British Columbia, Canada. The band formed with Dali Shaw on guitar, Julien Brousseau on bass and Miguel Shaw on drums. The three played a few shows without a vocalist and quickly recruited Jordan Daniel. 

The band recorded a five-song demo at Flying Monkey Studio in Kelowna and took a one-year hiatus.  The following summer, the band had an opportunity to tour Canada, upon which they decided to relocate to Montreal and renew their music career.  In Montreal they recruited Hal Ferris on second guitar.  Shortly after, The Gorgeous was signed to Distort Entertainment, and in the fall of 2005 recorded Great Lakes at Silo Studios in Stoney Creek.  The Gorgeous subsequently toured Canada several times and, in January 2007, toured the UK as direct support for the Architects.  A few months prior to this tour, Hal decided to go back to school, and was replaced by Kevin Keegan from A Javelin Reign and Bend Sinister.  The Gorgeous recorded one last demo to be used as promo for their upcoming album, and the four new songs are as of now on a fake Myspace page, under the name Jubilations.

They toured with the Cancer Bats in 2007 on their last tour. 

On March 7, 2007 on their MySpace page, the band announced they were breaking up. Most of the fans protested, and petitioned to keep the band together. 

After The Gorgeous ended guitarist Kevin Keegan was in a band called Barn Burner and later Dead Quiet, which he is still in. Bassist Julien Brousseau became a sound guy for Cancer Bats and also played in a band called Pup. Drummer Miguel Shaw played in a few small indie bands and guitarist Hal Ferris played in a few black metal bands. Vocalist Jordan Daniel is now known as The Boogieman Jordan Daniel, he plays blues and folk influenced music.

Discography 
 Skyline Shoreline
 Great Lakes (November 22, 2005) - Distort Entertainment

Videography 
2006 Shy Guys
2006 Lake Ontario
2007 Great Minds

References

External links
 The Gorgeous at Exclaim!
 The Gorgeous discography at allmusic
 The Gorgeous review at Canadian Music Week 2007
 The Gorgeous at Myspace
 The Gorgeous at Distort Entertainment
 Official The Boogieman Myspace

Musical groups established in 2003
Musical groups disestablished in 2007
Musical groups from Montreal
Canadian metalcore musical groups